White Butterfly is the second album from Essex alternative metal band InMe. It was released on 20 June 2005 under the record label V2 Records.

Track listing
"7 Weeks" - 3:42
"So You Know" - 3:38
"This Town" - 3:59
"Otherside" - 4:21
"Faster the Chase" - 3:32
"You'll Get There" - 3:35
"White Butterfly" - 3:45
"Safe in a Room" - 3:47
"Just a Glimpse" - 4:06
"Almost Lost" - 3:36
"A World Apart" - 3:30
"Chamber" - 4:43
"Parting Gift" - 2:10 [Hidden track]
"Angels with Snipers" [Limited edition] - 3:18 / "Screaming in Circles" [Japanese bonus track]
"Every Whisper Aches" [Limited edition] - 3:19

References

2005 albums
InMe albums
Albums produced by Josh Abraham
V2 Records albums